Neos Kosmos (meaning "New World") is a neighborhood in Athens, Greece.

History
In classical antiquity, the area of Neos Kosmos may have been the location of the gymnasium Cynosarges.

Geography
Neos Kosmos is south of the historic centre of the city.  Andrea Syngrou Avenue is one of the main roads of Neos Kosmos.

Public Transportation

Subway

Tram
Neos Kosmos is also served by the Athens Tram.

Sports
Thriamvos Athens, a multisport club founded in 1930, is based in Neos Kosmos. The club has won a panhellenic title in women's basketball and competes in various sports such as football, basketball, and volleyball.

References

Neighbourhoods in Athens